Marcel Perrière (22 November 1890 – 6 August 1966) was a Swiss racing cyclist. He was the Swiss National Road Race champion in 1911. He also rode in the 1914 Tour de France.

References

External links

1890 births
1966 deaths
Swiss male cyclists
Cyclists from Geneva